Kępa Chotecka  is a village in the administrative district of Gmina Wilków, within Opole Lubelskie County, Lublin Voivodeship, in eastern Poland.

The village has an approximate population of 200.

References

Villages in Opole Lubelskie County